Owtar (also Romanized as Owtār and Autar) is a village in Lisar Rural District, Kargan Rud District, Talesh County, Gilan Province, Iran. At the 2006 census, its population was 781, in 192 families.

References 

Populated places in Talesh County